The ruins of Spiš Castle in eastern Slovakia form one of the largest castle sites in Central Europe.  The castle is situated above the town of Spišské Podhradie and the village of Žehra, in the region known as Spiš.  It was included in the UNESCO list of World Heritage Sites in 1993 (together with the adjacent locations of Spišská Kapitula and Žehra).  This is one of the biggest European castles by area (41,426 m²).  It is administered by the Spiš Museum at Levoča, a division of the Slovak National Museum.

History

Origins

Spiš Castle was built in the twelfth century on the site of an earlier castle.  It was the political, administrative, economic and cultural center of Szepes County of the Kingdom of Hungary.  Before 1464, it was owned by the kings of Hungary, until the time of King Matthias Corvinus, then (until 1528) by the Zápolya family, the Thurzó family (1531–1635), the Csáky family (1638–1945), and (since 1945) by the state of Czechoslovakia and then Slovakia.

Originally a Romanesque stone castle with fortifications, a two-story Romanesque palace and a three-nave Romanesque-Gothic basilica were constructed by the second half of the thirteenth century.  A second extramural settlement was built in the fourteenth century, by which the castle area was doubled.  The castle was completely rebuilt in the fifteenth century; the castle walls were heightened and a third extramural settlement was constructed.  A late Gothic chapel was added around 1470.  The Zápolya clan performed late Gothic transformations, which made the upper castle into a comfortable family residence, typical of late Renaissance residences of the sixteenth and seventeenth centuries.

Decline and reconstruction
The last owners of the Spiš Castle, the Csáky family, abandoned the castle in the early eighteenth century because they considered it too uncomfortable to live in.  They moved to the newly built nearby village castles/palaces in Hodkovce near Žehra and Spišský Hrhov.

In 1780, the castle was destroyed in a fire.  The cause of the blaze is unknown, but there are a few theories. One is that the Csáky family purposefully burned it down to reduce taxes as at the time additional taxes applied to roofed buildings.  Another is that it was struck by lightning, which started the fire.  A third is that some soldiers in the castle were making moonshine and in the process accidentally started the fire.  Whatever the case, after the fire, the castle was no longer occupied and began to fall into disrepair.

The castle was partly reconstructed in the second half of the twentieth century, and extensive archaeological research was carried out on the site.  The reconstructed sections house displays of the Spiš Museum, which is responsible for managing the castle, and artefacts such as torture devices formerly used in the castle.

Image gallery

References

External links

 Tourist information about Spiš Castle and nearby Dreveník
 History of Spiš Castle
 History and photos of Spiš Castle 

Castles in Slovakia
World Heritage Sites in Slovakia
History museums in Slovakia
Spiš
12th-century architecture in Slovakia
Romanesque architecture in Slovakia
Gothic architecture in Slovakia
Former enclaves
Former exclaves